The Seventh Day is a 1922 American silent drama film directed by Henry King and starring Richard Barthelmess, Louise Huff, Frank Losee and Anne Cornwall. A group of high society New Yorkers on a yachting vacation put into a small New England fishing village for repairs. While there they strike up relationships with locals that threaten the harmony of their party.

Location shooting took place at New Harbor in Maine.

Plot
As described in a film magazine, John Alden Jr. (Barthelmess) returns to the small fishing village where he had grownup with his two old uncles, a spinster aunt, and his sister Betty (Cornwall). The old men tell him that they are going "into dry dock" and that he is to take command of the fishing boat the next time it leaves. That same day a yacht with a gay party of irresponsible young people aboard limps into the village harbor with bad pumps. John is at once attracted by the pretty Patricia Vane (Huff) while his sister is not averse to the admiration of Reggie Van Zandt (Stewart). Patricia wickedly entices the young rustic, but finds that she is playing with fire as her heart goes out to John while she is engaged to Reggie. Sunday, the seventh day, finds the merry crowd aboard the yacht playing "put and take" while John, Betty, their elderly relatives, and the "hired girl" are getting ready for church. Patricia and one of the crowd from the yacht go ashore to get some supplies and she is enticed to go to church, which is a novel experience for her. John takes her back in a row boat. Later, he calls on her in a motorboat and tells her that he loves her. It is then that he learns that she is engaged to Reggie. Disillusioned and hurt, he is told by Donald Peabody (Young) that Reggie has taken Betty aboard the yacht. John goes for his sister, knocking down Reggie when he objects. Reggie and Patricia decide to end their engagement, and Reggie manfully telling Betty of his love for her. At the end of the film Patricia is going to John.

Cast
 Richard Barthelmess as John Alden Jr
Louise Huff as Patricia Vane
 Frank Losee as Uncle Jim Alden 
 Leslie Stowe as Uncle Ned 
 Tammany Young as Donald Peabody 
 George Stewart as Reggie Van Zandt 
 Alfred Schmid as Monty Pell 
 Grace Barton as Aunt Abigail 
 Anne Cornwall as Betty Alden 
 Patterson Dial as Katinka
 Teddie Gerard as 'Billie' Blair

References

Bibliography
 Matthew Kennedy. Edmund Goulding's Dark Victory: Hollywood's Genius Bad Boy. Terrace Books, 2004.

External links

1922 films
1922 drama films
Silent American drama films
Films directed by Henry King
American silent feature films
1920s English-language films
First National Pictures films
American black-and-white films
1920s American films